Derrubone is a prenylated isoflavone, a type of flavonoid. It was originally isolated from the Indian tree Derris robusta. Recent research indicates that it acts as an inhibitor of Hsp90 to its function as a chaperone protein.

References 

Isoflavones
Prenylflavonoids
Benzodioxoles
Resorcinols